This is a list of characters—and the actor(s) who played them—featured in the BBC television series All Creatures Great and Small. Over 600 characters were used over ninety episodes, with several actors playing multiple characters during the course of the series.

James Herriot and Siegfried Farnon are the only two characters to appear in all ninety episodes. Tristan Farnon appears in sixty-five episodes.


Characters

A
Abbot, Mr — Kenneth Oxtoby
Adamson, Nathaniel — Harry Markham
Adderley — Michael Sheard
Agnes — Wendy Jackson
Ainsworth, Mrs — Gillian Barge
Alderson, Mr — John Collin
Allan, Fred — Tony Capstick
Alec — Peter Faulkner
Allen, Mr — Joe Ritchie
Allen, Mrs — Enid Irvin
Allenby, Mrs — Mary Wimbush
Allinson, Dr Harry — John Grieve
Almond, Jack — Bernard Atha
Alton, Jennie — Alison Ambler
Alton, Mrs — Jean Heywood
Alton, Sylvia — Debbie Arnold
Alton, Tim — Harry Walker
Anderson, Josh — Bobby Knutt
Angela — Chloë Annett
Appleby, Alison — Dinah Handley
Appleby, Brian — Dougie Brown
Appleby, Colin — James Mason
Arkwright, Daphne — Rita Giovannini
Atkinson, Mr — Gordon Wharmby
Auctioneer — Gordon Duffy
Aunt Lucy — Katharine Page

B
Bailie, Alice — Jill McCullough
Bailie, Richard — Steve Delaney
Bailes, Mr — Joby Blanshard
Bailey, Mr (dog owner) — Wally Thomas
Bailey, Mr — Peter Barnes
Bailey, Mrs — Sarah Grazebrook
Bagley, Eli — Tom Harrison
Bannister, Willie — Derek Hicks
Bantock, Mr — Roger Sloman
Barge, Aloysius — James Cossins
Barker, Mrs — Constance Chapman
Barman ("The Beauty of the Beast") — Norman Robbins
Barman ("Judgement Day") — Bert Oxley
Barnett, Walt — George Little
Barraclough, Geoffrey — Terry Taplin
Barraclough, Prudence — Sarah Morris
Barraclough, Verity — Claire Williamson
Barratt, George — David Daker
Barratt, Mrs — Fiona Walker
Bartle, Bert — Ray Gatenby
Bartram, Mrs — Fenella Norman
Baxter, Mrs — Frances Cox
Beamish, Ralph — Tony Steedman
Beck, Mrs — Peggy Ann Wood
Beckwith, Mr — Timothy Bateson
Bedford, Miss — Joyce Latham
Bell, Mrs — Sandra Gough
Bellerby, Bob — Sam Naylor
Bellerby, Mr — Joby Blanshard
Bellerby, Mrs — June Ellis
Bellerby, Ruth — Tricia George
Bennett, Granville — James Grout
Bennett, Zoe — Pamela Salem
Benson, Luke — John Junkin 
Benson, Rob — Norman Bird
Bentley, Joe — Finetime Fontayne
Beresford, Ronald — Kenneth Waller
Beresford, Mrs — Diana Flacks
Berrydale, Mr (radiogram salesman) — Max Marsh
Bert — Bruce Allen
Bert — Terry Gunn ("The Nelson Touch") and Nicholas Hamnett ("Hampered")
Beryl — Kathy Jones
Betty ("Advice & Consent") — Nancy Gower
Betty ("Ways and Means") — Julie Melvin
Biggins, Ezra — John Sharp
Biggins, Hilda— Kathleen Helme ("Every Dog His Day") and Margaret Jackman ("Cheques and Balances" and "If Music Be the Food of Love")
Billings, Ken — Barry Jackson
Bilton, Kit — Gorden Kaye ("Pups, Pigs and Pickle") and Bill Croasdale ("For Richer, For Poorer")
Bilton, Mrs — Muriel Rogers
Binks, Mrs — Maggie Ollerenshaw
Binks, Wesley — Michael Conway
Binns, Mr — John Keech
Binns, Tony — Simon Bleakley
Birse, Mrs — Diana Davies
Birtwhistle, Len — Ashley Baker
Birtwhistle, Mr — Norman Mitchell
Birtwhistle, Mrs — Ina Clough
Blackburn, Mr — Peter Ivatts
Blackwood, Mr — John Atkinson
Blackwood, Mrs — Sheila Mitchell
Blenkinsopp, Mr — William Hoyland
Blundell, David — Andrew Rowley
Boddy, Mr — Billy Regan
Boggs, Mr — Tony Nelson
Bond, Mr — Michael Lees & Kenneth Cranham
Bond, Mrs — Sonia Graham
Bootland, Malcolm — David Julian
Bootland, Seth — Guy Nicholls
Bosworth, Colonel (Charlie) — Michael Lees
Bosworth, Rachael — Dominique Barnes
Bourbon Ensemble, The — Harvey Brough, John Miller, Jeremy Taylor, Richard Allen, Nick Barraclough
Bowling — Ray Ashcroft
Boy ("Tricks of the Trade") — Craig Brigg
Boy ("Puppy Love") — David Thackwray
Bradbury, Mr — Tony Havering
Bradley, David — Sidney Livingstone
Bradley, Jonathan — David Ellison
Bradley, Mrs — Megs Jenkins
Braithwaite, Arnie — John Gill
Braithwaite, David — Ian Bleasdale
Bramley, Ruth — Olga Grahame
Brannan, Stewie — Ronald Lacey ("The Last Furlong") and Dinsdale Landen ("Food For Thought")
Bravington, Mrs — Josephine Antosz
Brawton, Lord — John Hart Dyke
Brawton, Lady — Mary Kenton
Brenda (double-date partner of Tristan) — Eileen Waugh
Briggs, Barbara — Maggie Norris
Briggs, Nat — Joe McGann
Broadbent, Sam — Ashley Barker
Broadwith, Mrs — Jean Marlow
Brocklehurst, Rosemary — Emma Hardy
Brompton, Diana — Georgina Melville
Brough, Lionel — Johnny Leeze
Brown, Cliff — David Hargreaves
Bruce, Andrew — David Quilter
Buchanan, Calum — John McGlynn
Buckle, Billy — Paul McLain
Buckle, Mr — Tom Harrison
Bull Farmer ("A Cat in Hull's Chance") — Patrick Burke
Bullen, Major — Norman Shelley ("A Dog's Life") and Mark Kingston ("Cheques and Balances")
Buller, Colonel — Morris Barry
Bullivant, Major ("The Bull with the Bowler Hat") — Uncredited 
Bullock, Mr — Roger Walker
Burns, Mrs — Molly Weir
Busby, Mr — Harold Goodwin
Bush, Mr — Alex Robinson
Bushell, Mr — Bill Lund
Butler, Mrs — Marjorie Suddell
Butterfield, Lenny — Tony Cervi
Buttermere, Lord — Edward Dentith
Butterworth, Mrs — Kay Mellor
Butterworth, Wendy — Sarah Stubbs

C
Calvert, Mrs — Lorraine Peters
Calvert, Phineas — Johnny Allan ("Horse Sense") and Alan Partington ("The Healing Touch" and "For Richer, For Poorer")
Carmody, Richard — Christopher Brown (as Chris Brown)
Carter, Harold — Ted Moult
Carter, Mr ("One of Nature's Little Miracles") — John Rapley
Carter, Mr ("Spring Fever") — Ian Thompson
Cartwright, Mrs — Audrey Noble
Casling, Mr — Johnny Allen
Chandler, Mr — Ivan Beavis
Chapman, Bert — Brian Osborne
Chapman, Mrs — Lorraine Peters
Charlie — John Who
Charlie ("Matters of Life and Death") — Mike Kelly
Charlie ("The Nelson Touch" and "Hampered") — James Garbutt
Clark, Mr — Bert Gaunt
Clark, Suzie — Samantha Smith
Clarke, Mary — Jessica Sewell
Clarke, Mrs — Thora Hird
Clayton — Peter Wallis
Clifford, Joan — Suzanne Neve
Clintock, Henry — Ian Collier
Clinton — Peter Duncan
Close, Albert — Burt Brooks
Coach Driver ("Hail Caesar!") — Mike Wardle
Coates, Mr — Randal Herley
Coates, Mrs — Ruth Kettlewell
Cobb, Humphrey — James Bree
Coker, Mr — Dave Calderhead
Collins, Mr — Malcolm Rogers
Connie (double-date partner of James) — Jean Harrington
Cooper, Dan (farmer) — Joe Belcher
Corner, Robert — Noel Cameron
Cotterell, Paul — Nicholas Courtney
Courtenay, Basil — Andrew Seear
Cranford, Isaac (farmer) — Jack Watson
Crawford, Captain — Paul Brooke
Crawford, Hugh — Neil Nisbet
Crawford, Mr — Richard Syms
Crony — Derek Crewe
Cropper, Harry — Anthony Addams
Crossley, Jim — Victor Gilling
Crump, Albert (farmer) — George A. Cooper
Crump, Mrs — Pearl Hackney
Cundall, Ron — Fred Gaunt
Cundall, Mrs — Joan Campion
Curate ("Every Dog His Day") — Barry McGinn
Cyril — Bryn Ellis

D
D’Arcy, Brigadier/Colonel — Eric Dodson
Dakin, Mr — George Malpas
Dalby, Billy (farmer) — Cyril Appleton
Dalby, Mrs — Janet Davies
Dalby, William — Stephen Bratt
Dance Band ("Out of Practice") — Ernest Tomasso, Jeanne Tomasso, Paul Ripley
Darnley, Edie — Helen Lindsay
Darnley, Sybil — Annette Badland
Davey, Mrs — Kathleen Worth
David — Nicholas Evans
Dawson, Horace (farmer) — Joe Holmes
Dawson, Mr (farmer) — Brian Glover
Dean, Mr (client) — George Malpas
Denham, Harold — Martin Matthews
Dent, Charlie (farmer) — Stan Richards
Dent, Mr — John Barrett
Derrick, Bob — Freddie Fletcher
Derrick, Jean — Sheila Tait
Dibble, Mr — Ced Beaumont
Dickson, Henry — Bernard Atha
Dimmock, Mr — John Comer and Harry Goodier
Dimmock, Mrs — Margaret Heery
Dimmock, Nellie/Eleanor — Georgina Eastwood and Jane Clifford
Dinsdale, Mr — Alan Starkey
Dinsdale's brother — Wilfrid Brambell
Dixon (farmer) — Michael Stainton
Dixon, Jonathan — Peter McCulloch
Dobbs — Edward Peel
Dobson, Ted — Ken Kitson
Dodson, Mr — Johnny Maxfield
Donovan, Mrs — Sheila Reid
Dooley, Miss — Avril Angers
Downs — Glenn Cunningham
Dowson, Mr — John Ronane ("Breath of Life") and Barry Jackson ("Blood and Water")
Dryden, Mrs — Olive Pendleton
Dugdale, Mr — Harry Beety
Duggleby — Alan Hockey
Duke of Mannerton — Ernest Clark
Dumbleby, Mr — Dick Brannick
Dunn, Matilda — Ann Way
Dunn, Muriel — Rosamund Greenwood
Dunning, Dick — Colin Meredith

E
Earnshaw — Stan Jay
Edgeworth, Mr — Bill Lund
Edmundson, Richard (friend of Helen's) — Norman Mann
Edmundson, Mr (Richard's father) — John Rolls
Edna (Mrs Pumphrey's housekeeper) — Anthea Holloway
Edwards, Mr — Ken Farrington
Egerton, Margery — Lois Baxter
Elder, John — Martin Potter
Emma — Veronica Smart

F
Fairburn, Mr — John Biggerstaff
Farmer ("Brink of Disaster") — Wilfred Grove
Farmhand ("Attendant Problems") — Russell Denton
Farmhand ("Pride of Possession") — Tommy Edwards
Farmhand ("Pups, Pigs and Pickle") — Bill Lund
Farmer, Angela — Madeline Smith
Farnon, Siegfried (owner of Skeldale House surgery) — Robert Hardy
Farnon, Tristan (younger brother of Siegfried) — Peter Davison
Fawcett, Dick — James Ottaway
Felicity ("Calf Love") — Uncredited 
Fellowes, Mr — Jackie Shinn
Fenton, Con — Henry Livings
Finch, Ned — Robin Parkinson
First Nurse — Eliza Hunt
First Owner ("Home and Away") — Martin Oldfield
Fisher, Caroline — Annie Lambert
Flaxton, Mr — John Alkin
Flaxton, Mrs — Fiona Gray
Forsyth, George — Finetime Fontayne
Francois (Mrs Pumphrey's butler) — Graham Rowe
Fred (barman in "Tricks of the Trade") – Terry Pearson
Fred — Mark Torvic
Fred ("Big Steps and Little 'Uns") — Joe Figg
Fred (1985 Christmas Special) — Tommy Harper
Freddy — Neil Godden
Fu Manchu — Paul Gee

G
Garrett, Mr — Wilfred Grove
Garston, Jenny — Dorothy Tutin
George — Mark Blackwell-Baker
George (postman in "Place of Honour") — Uncredited
George ("Plenty to Grouse About") — Julian Garlick
George (barman in "Alarms and Excursions") — Andrew Lane
George ("The Call of the Wild") — Anthony Wise
Gibbons, Sep — Duncan Preston
Gibson — John Evitts
Gillard, Angela — Elaine Donnelly
Gillard, Frank — Sam Dale
Gillard, Mary — Gemma Peers
Gilling, Mr — Donald Nithsdale
Gipsy boy ("Out of Practice") — Nicholas Wright
Gipsy girl ("Out of Practice") — Julie Ibbotson
Gillard, Marjorie — Sandra Payne
Gillard, Peter — Jonathan Owen
Goodman, Dan — Ted Richards
Grantley, Anne — Madeline Smith
Greenlaw, Mrs — Judy Wilson
Gregson, Mr — Donald Morley
Grier, Angus — Andrew Crawford
Grier, Mrs — Lucy Griffiths
Griffiths, Mr — Geoffrey Reed
Grimes, Bert — Jack Carr
Grimsdale, Ted — Bryan Pringle

H
Hall, Edna (Skeldale House housekeeper) — Mary Hignett
Hall, Sam — Steve Collins
Hammond, Mr — Tim Barker
Hammond, Mrs — Patsy Byrne
Hamson, Elijah — Peter Davidson
Hamson, Len — Joe Gladwin
Handshaw, Arthur (farmer) — Peter Martin
Handshaw, Eric (farmer) — Ashley Barker
Harbottle, Miss (Winifred) (Skeldale's first secretary) — Madge Ryan
Harcourt, Charles — John Ringham
Hardacre, Ted — Ted Carroll
Hardwicke, Arthur — Ralph Bowland
Hardwicke, Ben — Carl Rae
Harker, Mrs — Anne Jameson
Harker, Vernon — Rod Arthur
Harris, Joe — Roger Bingham
Harris, Simon — Graham Wicinskj
Harry — David Straun
Hart, Mr — Michael Bilton
Hart, Mrs — Veda Warwick
Hartley, Bill — Peter Martin
Hatfield, Geoff — Geoffrey Bayldon
Hawden, Lord — William Fox
Hawkins, Mary — William Ilkley
Hawley, Mr — David Miller
Hazlitt, Barbara — Christine Kavanagh
Headingley, Deirdre — Josephine Hollis
Headingley, Major — Hilary Wontner
Head Lad ("The Last Furlong") – Gordon Reid
Head Waiter ("Out of Practice") — David Davenport
Henderson, Wilf — Arnold Peters
Herriot, Helen (James' wife) — Carol Drinkwater and Lynda Bellingham
Herriot, James (business partner of Siegfried) — Christopher Timothy
Herriot, Jimmy — Harry Brayne, Oliver Wilson and Paul Lyon
Herriot, Rosie — Rebecca Smith and Alison Lewis
Herron, Mrs — Jean Campbell-Dallas
Hewison, Mr — Robert Brown
Hewison, Mrs — Cynthia Etherington
Hill — Jackie Shinn
Hinchcliffe, Herbie — Frederick Bennett
Hindley, George — Keith Marsh
Hird, Tagger — Stephen Mallatratt
Hird, Mrs — Pearl Hackney
Hodgekin, William (Mrs Pumphrey's gardener-servant-chauffeur) — Teddy Turner
Holroyd, Mrs — Peggy Sinclair
Hopgood, Jess — Richard Steele
Hopps, Mr — David Cook
Horace — Jack Haig
Horner, Mr — Colin Douglas
Horner, Mrs — Norah Fulton
Howell, Mr — Keith Marsh
Howell, Mrs — Josephine Antosz
Hubbard, Mrs — Marjorie Suddell
Hucknall, Jack — Danny Davies
Hudson, Clem — Tony Capstick
Hudson, Dick — Nigel Collins
Hudson, Herbert — James Tear
Hugill, Fenwick — Bill Rodgers
Hugill, Thomas — John de Frates
Hugill, Walter — Roger Grainger
Hugill, William — Ted Beyer
Hughie — Tubby Andrews
Hulton, Lady — Joanna McCallum
Hulton, Lord — Frederick Treves

I
Ingledew, Harold — Frank Mills
Ingram, Kate — Hannah Thomson
Inspector Green — John Arthur
Inspector Halliday — Howard Southern

J
Jacques — André Maranne
Jenkins, Colonel — Bert Parnaby
Jenkins, Mr — Raymond Witch
Jeweller — Alan Starkey
Judith — Sarah Dangerfield

K
Katharine — Caroline Webster
Kealey, Bert — Terry Gilligan
Kealey, Mrs — Brenda Halbrook
Kendall, Joe (farmer) — Dickie Arnold
Kenning, Albert — Malcolm Hebden
Kirby, Mr — Brian Hayes
Kitson — John Barrett

L
Landlord ("A Friend for Life") — Tony Peers
Landlord (1983 Christmas Special) — Eddie Caswell
Landlord (1985 Christmas Special) — D. J. Huckerby
Landlord of Pub ("Old Dogs, New Tricks") — Chris Collins
Lawrence, Angela — Hannah Fawcett
Lawrence, Keith — Martin Matthews
Len — Barry Hart
Little Boy ("Cats and Dogs") — Nicholas Wright
Little Boy ("Alarms and Excursions") — Jason Lockwood
Little Girl ("Cats and Dogs") — Mollie Walker
Little Girl ("Alarms and Excursions") — Philippa Lund
Livingstone, Miss — Hope Johnstone
Longshaw, Bert — Dave Hill
Lumsden, Mr — John Whittock
Lupton, Mr — Anthony Benson
Lydia — Sue Bond

M
Mallaby — Anthony Langdon
Mallard, Mrs — Barbara Angell
Mallock, Jeff (knackerman) — Frank Birch (from seasons 1 to 3) and Fred Feast (from series 4 to 7)
Mallock, Winston — Claude Close
Man in car ("A Dog's Life") — D. Geoff Tomlinson
Man on bus ("Horse Sense") — Ted Carroll
Manton, Joe — Kevin Walton
Mariner, Tom — Harry Drewry
Marion — Mary Chester
Marston, Linda — Dee Sadler
Marston, Mrs — Sheila Raynor
Marston, Peter — Will Leighton
Massingham, Sir William — Kevin Stoney
Mason, George — Joseph Peters
Mason, Mr — Geoffrey Bayldon
Mason, Mrs — June Ellis
Mavis — Jane Beaumont
Maxwell, Tom — Peter Ivatts
Maxwell, Tess — Alex Wilson
McEwan, Deirdre — Andrea Gibb
McFeely, Molly — Sharon Twomey
McTavish, Alice — Elizabeth Millbank
Meeker, Mr — Michael Brennan
Mercer, Jane — Lesley Nightingale
Mercer, Mr — Geoffrey Banks
Merrick, Hubert — Alan Rothwell
Metcalfe, Frank — James Lister
Metcalfe, Mary — Rachel Davies
Meynell, Mr — Danny James
Meynell, Mrs — Mary Wray
Minikin, Mollie — Katharine Page
Miranda — Aimee Jackson
Morton, Mr — Simon Carter
Mottram, Hilary — Jack Watson
Mount, Deborah (Debbie) — Judi Maynard
Mount, Caleb — David King ("If Wishes Were Horses") and John Woodvine (1985 Christmas Special)
Moverley — Stuart Golland
Mulligan, Joe (client) — Rio Fanning
Murray — Andrew Robertson
Murray, Mrs — Catriona Macdonald
Muriel — Uncredited (bar woman in "Plenty to Grouse About")
Myatt, Margie — Uncredited
Myatt, Jess — Michael Holt

N
Nellist, Rupe — John Turtle
Newhouse, Gobber (farmer) — Ivor Salter
Noakes, Mrs — Joyce Kennedy
Norman (barman in "Blood and Water") — Jack Featherstone
Nurse Duggan — Alison Lloyd
Nurse Brown — Marlene Sidaway

O
O'Brian, Nick — Brian McGrath
Oakley, Percy — Andrew Abrahams
Ogilvie, Bill — Paul Dawkins
Ormonroyd, Charlie — John Blain

P
Parker, Susie — Francesca Hall
Partridge, Roland — Geoffrey Bayldon
Pattison, Kitty — Jayne Lester
Paul — Nick Timothy
Pavlechenko, Ludmilla — Kay Woodman
P.C. Claude Blenkiron — Colin Fay
P.C. Goole — Steve Haliwell
P.C. Hicks — Mark Jordon
P.C. Leach — Stephen Riddle
P.C. Smith — John Hallett
Pearson, Jacob — Douglas Ditta
Peart, Harold — William Ivory
Pedretti, Franco — Ray Mangion
Pendlebury, Leslie — Hugh Walters 
Penn, Albert — Robert Garrett
Perowne, Roderick — William Squire
Peter — Richard Houlihan
Pettinger, Mrs — Anna Turner
Phil — Tim Dantay
Pianist ("Alarms and Excursions") — Ena Baga
Pickersgill, Mr — Peter Schofield
Pickersgill, Olive — Cecily Hobbs
Pickles, Edge — Mike Kay
Pilling, Mrs — Anne Raitt
Pilling, Seth — Malcolm Terris
Pinkerton, Mr — Alan Hockey
Plenderleith, Mr — James Bree
Plenderleith, Mrs — Gabrielle Daye
Plumb, Miss — Jenny Jay
Polenov, Captain — Michael Poole
Potts, Jim — Charles Rea
Potts, Mrs — Gabrielle Blunt
Pounder, Mrs — Kristine Howarth
Pratt, Dennis — Ken Wynne
Professor Norton — Edward Burnham
Pub customers ("Horse Sense") — Leslie Sarony, James Ottaway
Punter ("Home and Away") — Mike Clifton
Pymm, Mr — John Moore
Pumphrey, Mrs (aristocratic client of the surgery) — Margaretta Scott
Mrs Pumphrey's maid — Mandy Earle

R
Raczinski, Dr — Valerie Sarruf
Ramsey, Bill — Sam Davies
Randall, Tom — Rodney Litchfield
Ransom, Major General — Geoffrey Toone
Ransom, Mrs — Jeanne Mockford
Raven, Trooper — Steve Hodson
Raworth, Sarah — Jane Morant
Ray — John Wild
Rayner, David — Frank Windsor
Rayner, Elizabeth — Amanda Waring
Rayner, Geoffrey — Howard Ward
Reed, Mr — Johnny Barrs
Restaurant Diner ("Here and There") — Frank Harling
Reverend Henty — Jack May
Reynolds — Tom Harrison
Ridge, Mrs — Wanda Ventham
Rigby, Bob — Michael Graham Cox
Ripley, Mr — Graham Rigby
Ripley, Mrs — Elizabeth Glennon
Roper, Mr — Geoffrey Leesley
Ross, Ewan — Alex McCrindle ("Fair Means and Fowl") and David Ashton ("Old Dogs, New Tricks")
Ross, Virginia — Gwen Cherrell
Rudd, Charlie — Gerald James
Rudd, Maurice — Nial Padden
Rupe — Danny O'Dea

S
Sally ("If Music Be The Food of Love") — Uncredited 
Sam — Philip Whileman
Sam (1990 Christmas Special) — Steve Sangster
Sanders, Betty — Gillian Hanna
Sanders, Jack — James Warrior
Scargill, Mr — Tom Mennard
Scott, Jack — Philip Martin Brown
Scott, Sheila — Natalie Clegg
Scott, Tony — Ryan O'Neill
Seaton, Mrs (farmer's wife) — Margaret Heery
Second Nurse — Katy Feeney
Second Owner ("Home and Away") — John de Frates
Sergeant Bannister — Graham Hamilton
Shadwell, Bill — Howard Goorney
Shadwell, Joanna — Marian Hutton
Shadwell, Louise — Rachel James
Shadwell, Molly — Avril Angers
Shadwell, Peter — Dominic Guard
Sharpe, Bert (farmer) — Paul Luty
Shop assistant ("Be Prepared") — Linda Bardell
Sidlow — William Abney
Sidney — Alan Hulse
Simmons, Mr — Renny Krupinski
Simon — Joss Brook
Simpson, Marjorie — Julie Shipley
Sir Robert — Donald Pickering
Sister Louise Rose — Jessica Spencer ("Out of Practice") and Irene Sutcliffe ("The New World" and 1985 Christmas Special)
Skelton, Cornelius — Michael Watkins
Skelton, Marmaduke — Edward Peel
Skerry, Albert — William Moore
Skipton — Edwin Finn
Skipton, Mr — Tony Melody
Small boy with puppy ("Judgement Day") — Mitchell Varnam
Smedley — Danny James
Smethurst, Mr — Ted Beyer
Smethick, Mr — John Pickles
Smith — Arthur Griffiths
Smithers, Mr — Fred Gaunt
Smithers (Young) — Charles Booth
Soames (Lord Hulton's stable master) — George Selway
Soldier ("Alarms and Excursions") — Graham Hamilton
Sowden, Mr — Larry Noble
St. John — Peter Alexander
Stallholder (1983 Christmas Special) — Anna Turner
Steven — Andrew Losowsky
Stockdale, Adam — Paul Grunert
Stockdale, Bob — Tim Wylton
Stokes, Barry — David Kershaw
Stokill, Mr — Al Gillyon
Stott, Mr — Alan Hulse
Strong, Oliver — Gordon Gostelow
Strong, Roland — Walter Sparrow
Stubbs, Miss — Una Brandon-Jones
Stubbs, Sammy — Haydn Conway
Summergill, Arnold — Charles West
Sumner, Harry (farmer) — Robin Scobey
Sutcliffe, Mr — Warren Clarke
Sweetman, Mr — Howard Crossley
Sweetman, Myra — Maureen Lunt
Sykes, Mr — Bill Lund

T
Tamworth-Brown, Mrs — Betty Turner
Tanner, Emma — Lynne Ross
Tanner, Simon — Stephen Dudley
Tansy, Jack — Robert Falconer
Tansy, Mr — Tony Havering
Taverner, Dick — Glyn Owen
Taverner, Julia — Caroline Holdaway
Taverner, Beatrice — Pamela Gale
Taylor, Bob — Mark Botham
Trueman, Freddie — Bill Cashmore
Rachel Taylor — Tracy-Jane White
Teasdale, Mr — John Taylor
Ted (first barman of the Drovers Arms) — Michael Shannon
Temple, Alice — Mollie Maureen
Thompson, Miss — Anna Turner
Thornton, Susie — Judy Brooke
Thwaite, Tommy — John Rutland
Thwaites, Mr — Joe Belcher
Tibbett, Mrs — Annie Leon
Tilson, Mrs — Elaine Donnelly
Tolly — John Pennington
Tom ("The Beauty of the Beast") — John Kellett
Tom ("Faint Hearts") — Danny O'Dea
Tommy — Derry Jordan
Tompkins, Mrs — Anthea Holloway
Travers, Roddy — Patrick Troughton ("Hair of the Dog") and James Ellis ("In Whom We Trust")
Trenholm, Mary — Vivien Keene
Trenholm, Peter — James Norris
Tremayne, Colonel — Anthony Dawes
Tremayne, Mrs — Jean Fergusson
Truscott, Glenys — Colette Stevenson
Tyreman, Cliff — Tony Sympson

U
Umpire ("The Name of the Game") — Ken Hastwell
Umpire ("Big Fish, Little Fish") — George Tunstall
Unwin, Gordon — Geoff Oldham

V
Van driver ("Plenty to Grouse About") — Malcolm Raeburn
Vaughan, Susan — Sabina Franklyn
Vera — Sharon Cheyne
Vicar ("A Friend for Life") — Glenn Cunningham
Vicar (1990 Christmas Special) — Aubrey Phillips
Vine, Andrew — Trevor Ainsley

W
Wain, Bernard — Peter Benson
Wain, Mary-Jane — Ruth Holden
Waiter ("Knowin' How to Do It") — Jack Featherstone
Waiter (1985 Christmas Special) — Sean Glenn
Wakeman, Major — Roger Brierley
Warrington, Bill — Trevor Nelson
Watson, Terry — Peter Lorenzelli
Watson, Mrs — Hilary Trott
Weeting, Brian — Paul Clayton
Weeting, Dennis — Paul Butterworth
Weeting, Mr — Terry Waddington
Wellerby, Mr — Reg Lever
Wenlow, Silas — Richard Cole
Westby, Jane — Rebecca Sowden
Westby, Mrs — Amanda Waldy
Westby, Sarah — Kathryn Barry
Westerman, Miss — Joan Young
Wheatley, Mrs — Enid Irvin
White, Mr (farmer) — Johnny Maxfield
Whitehead, George — Edward Phillips
Whithorn, Mr — Edwin Richfield
Whithorn, Mrs — Jenny Laird
Wiggins, Mr — Ray Mort
Wiggs, Albert — Alan Helm
Wilf ("Puppy Love") — Dene Edwards
Wilf ("The Playing Field") — Mark Shorto
Wilkey, Reg — Charles Pemberton
Wilkin, Seb — Richard Mapletoft
Wilkinson, Mr — Terry Cantor
Willis, Mr — Alan Hulse
Willis, Tom — David Theakston
Wilson, Mr — Jeff Nuttall
Wireless announcer (voice, 1990 Christmas Special) — Frank Windsor
Witchell, Sam — Preston Lockwood
Woman with pony ("Judgement Day") — Gillian McClements
Woodley, David — Craig McFarlane
Worley, Mr (barman) — Nicholas McArdle
Worrall, Sally — Rosalind Wilson

Y
Young Man — Ray Boot
Young Woman — Kate Kitovitz
Youth ("Home and Away") — David Clayforth

Recurring characters

Several farmers make recurring appearances throughout the series. Mr Biggins (John Sharp) is a notorious payment-dodger who regularly attempts to procure free service out of the practice, as well as decrying the cost of the vets' visits. In one episode he calls Herriot out to question a bill charge from 18 months earlier. On another occasion, in exchange for Herriot's assistance with a puncture on his car, Biggins agrees to settle his account. Little does Herriot know that Biggins post-dated the cheque. Biggins' first name is revealed to be Ezra in the series 7 episode "If Music Be the Food of Love". "John Sharp was just like you see him," recalled Peter Davison. "He was a wonderful raconteur and would tell you these long stories." Christopher Timothy added: "I found myself getting quite moved when I watched an episode recently, not because of what we were doing, but because all those lovely people are no longer with us. John Sharp was a lovely, lovely man."

Bill Hartley (Peter Martin, who also plays Arthur Handshaw in series 1 and 2), meanwhile, is a relatively good-natured client, compared to the perpetually disgruntled Ted Grimsdale (Bryan Pringle). "Peter Martin was fantastic," remembered Peter Davison. "He was mainly known then for the Jewson commercials. He was just very funny. He played two parts for us over the years."

Knackerman Jeff Mallock (Frank Birch from series 1 to 3 and Fred Feast from series 4 to 7) is regularly waiting in the wings to take ailing livestock to his knacker's yard. Whatever the vets' diagnosis, Mallock always thinks the real reason is "stagnation o' t'lung".

Fellow vet Granville Bennett (James Grout), a cat and dog specialist, is often on hand to help out with the more severe small animal cases. His enjoyment of alcohol is always of a concern for James, however, who regularly ends up inebriated and making a fool of himself in front of Bennett's wife, Zoe (Pamela Salem), whom he always thought considered him a dipsomaniac. "One of the guest characters we both adored was Granville Bennett, from whom James never escaped without being utterly plastered," recalled Sandy Byrne, the widow of writer Johnny Byrne. "He was played by James Grout, who was wonderful! He very much enjoyed writing for Mrs Pumphrey and Hodgekin too."

As evidenced by Peter Martin above, several actors played more than one character throughout the course of the series; none more so than Bill Lund, who played four people: Mr Sykes in "Fair Means and Fowl", a farmhand in "Pups, Pigs and Pickle", Mr Edgeworth in the 1985 Christmas Special and Mr Bushell in "Hail Caesar!".

Geoffrey Bayldon played three characters: Roland Partridge in "Pride of Possession", Mr Mason in the 1983 Christmas Special and confectioner Geoff Hatfield in "Where Sheep May Safely Graze".

Anna Turner also played three characters: Miss Thompson in "Big Steps and Little 'Uns", a stall holder in the 1983 Christmas Special and Mrs Pettinger in "A Cat in Hull's Chance".

Jack Watson played two cantankerous characters: farmer Isaac Cranford in "Nothing Like Experience" and vet Hilary Mottram in "One of Nature's Little Miracles". He reprised the role of Cranford in the 1990 Christmas Special.

Others who played two or more characters:
Alan Hockey: Duggleby in "Brink of Disaster" and Mr.Pinkerton in "Barks and Bites"  
Ashley Barker: Eric Handshaw in "Dog Days", Sam Broadbent in "Practice Makes Perfect" and Len Birtwhistle in "A Present From Dublin" and "The New World"
Joby Blanshard: Mr Bailes in "Pig in the Middle" and Mr Bellerby in "Faint Hearts"
Anthea Holloway plays Mrs Tompkins in "Faint Hearts". Three series later, she plays Mrs Pumphrey's housemaid, Edna
George Malpas: Mr Dean in "Dog Days" and Mr Dakin in "The Bull with the Bowler Hat"
Joe Belcher: Dan Cooper in "Dog Days" and Mr Thwaites in "Only One Woof"
Enid Irvin: Mrs Allen in "Sleeping Partners" and Mrs Wheatley in "For Richer, For Poorer"
Alan Hulse: Mr Willis in "Hair of the Dog" and Mr Stott in "The Pig Man Cometh"
Pearl Hackney: Mrs Crump in "Calf Love" and Mrs Hird in "Choose a Bright Morning"
Avril Angers: Miss Dooley in "Pups, Pigs and Pickle" and Molly Shadwell in "A Friend for Life"
Barry Jackson: Ken Billings in "Matters of Life and Death" and Mr Dowson in "Blood and Water"
Madeline Smith: Angela Farmer in "Pride of Possession" and Anne Grantley in the 1983 Christmas Special
Katharine Page: Aunt Lucy in "Golden Lads and Girls" and Mollie Minikin in "Only One Woof"
Fine Time Fontayne: George Forsyth in the 1985 Christmas Special and Joe Bentley in "A New Chapter"
Tony Capstick: Fred Allan in "In Whom We Trust" and Clem Hudson in the 1985 Christmas Special
June Ellis: Mrs Bellerby in "Faint Hearts" and Mrs Mason in "The New World"
Michael Lees: Mr Bond in "Cats and Dogs" and Colonel Bosworth in "The Healing Touch"
Peter Ivatts: Mr Blackburn in "A Dying Breed" and Tom Maxwell in "The Bull With the Bowler Hat" and "Against the Odds"
James Bree: Mr Plenderleith in "Out of Practice" and Humphrey Cobb in "The Bull With the Bowler Hat"
Danny O'Dea: Tom in "Faint Hearts" and Rupe in "The Pig Man Cometh"
Graham Hamilton: a soldier in "Alarms and Excursions" and Sergeant Bannister in the 1983 Christmas Special
Danny James: Smedley in "Dog Days" and Mr Meynell in "The Jackpot"
John Barrett: Kitson in "Breath of Life" and Mr Dent in "Every Dog His Day"
Keith Marsh: George Hindley in "Will to Live" and Mr Howell in "The Prodigal Returns"
Dickie Arnold: Joe Kendall in "Nothing Like Experience" and "A Dog's Life" and Will in "The Pig Man Cometh"
Tom Harrison: Reynolds in "Dog Days", Eli Bagley in "Bulldog Breed" and Mr. Buckle in "One of Nature's Little Miracles"
Edward Peel: Dobbs in "Barks and Bites" and Marmaduke'Duke'Skelton in "Fair Means and Fowl"
Martin Matthews: Mr.Denham in "Ways and Means" and Keith Lawrence in "A Cat in Hull's Chance"
 
"They used some genuine Yorkshire characters to play the farmers," recalled Sandy Byrne, "so [Johnny] relished writing for them because they were so quirky and funny." Robert Hardy concurs: "What I think made the thing a success was those Yorkshire and Lancashire actors we had playing the farmers. They were wonderful. They lent a real authenticity to their stuff, farmers complaining about their bills and all that."

Ted Moult, who played Harold Carter, was a real farmer in the 1940s but became a radio and television personality in the mid-1960s. He committed suicide in 1986, aged 60, after a period of depression after several weeks of wet weather that worried arable farmers.

In addition to the roles of Helen Herriot, her children and Jeff Mallock, a few characters were played by more than one actor:

Dr.Harry Allinson: John Grieve in "Bulldog Breed" & Richard Butler (uncredited) in "The Nelson Touch"
Charlie (Lord Hulton's estate worker) Mike Kelly in "Matters of Life and Death" and James Garbutt in "The Nelson Touch" & "Hampered"
Hilda Biggins: Kathleen Helme and Margaret Jackman
Kit Bilton: Gorden Kaye and Bill Croasdale
Mr Bond: Michael Lees in "Cats and Dogs" & Kenneth Cranham in "Call of the Wild" (mute & uncredited)
Stewie Brannan: Ronald Lacey and Dinsdale Landen
Major Bullen: Norman Shelley and Mark Kingston
Phineas Calvert: Johnny Allan and Alan Partington
Mr Dimmock: John Comer and Harry Goodier
Eleanor "Nellie" Dimmock: Georgina Eastwood and Jane Clifford
Mr Dowson: John Ronane and Barry Jackson
Caleb Mount: Dave King (actor) and John Woodvine
Ewan Ross: Alex McCrindle and David Ashton. The character was based on Frank Bingham, Brian Sinclair's first assistant. Bingham died "like many good vets, in a cow byre doing a tough job."
Sister Rose: Jessica Spencer and Irene Sutcliffe
Roddy Travers: Patrick Troughton and James Ellis (actor)

References 
Specific

General
All Creatures Great and Small full cast and crew at IMDb

All Creatures